Argyle is an archaic spelling of Argyll, a county in western Scotland. Argyle may refer to:

Places

Australia
 Argyle, Victoria
 Argyle County, New South Wales
Electoral district of Argyle, a former electoral district for the Legislative Assembly of New South Wales
 Argyle Downs, a pastoral lease in Western Australia
 Lake Argyle, an artificial lake in Western Australia

Canada
 Argyle, Manitoba
 Rural Municipality of Argyle, Manitoba
 Argyle, Nova Scotia, municipality
 Argyle, Nova Scotia (community)
 Argyle (electoral district), Nova Scotia
 Argyle Sound, Nova Scotia
 Central Argyle, Nova Scotia
 Lower Argyle, Nova Scotia
 Argyle (Guysborough), Nova Scotia
 Argyle, Ontario
 Argyle Shore Provincial Park, Prince Edward Island
 Rural Municipality of Argyle No. 1, Saskatchewan

Hong Kong
 Argyle Street, Hong Kong

United States
 Argyle, Florida
 Argyle, Georgia
 Argyle, Illinois
 Argyle, Iowa
Argyle, Kentucky
 Argyle (Houma, Louisiana)
 Argyle, Maine
 Argyle Township, Michigan
 Argyle, Minnesota
 Argyle, Missouri
 Argyle (town), New York
 Argyle (village), New York
 Argyle, Texas
 Argyle, Utah, a ghost town
 Argyle, Washington
 Argyle, West Virginia
 Argyle (town), Wisconsin
 Argyle, Wisconsin, village within the town

People 
 Michael Argyle (lawyer) (1915–1999), UK judge
 Michael Argyle (psychologist) (1925–2002), 20th century British social psychologist
 Pearl Argyle (1910–1947), South African ballet dancer and actress
 Stanley Argyle (1867–1940), Australian politician

Fictional characters 
 Argyle, a character in the film Die Hard
 Argyle, a character in the fourth season of Stranger Things
 Sai Argyle, a fictional character in the anime Mobile Suit Gundam SEED

Transportation
 Argyle, the former name for Mong Kok station MTR station, located on Argyle Street, Hong Kong
 Argyle (CTA), a station on the Chicago Transit Authority's "L" system
 Argyle Street, a railway station in Glasgow, Scotland
 Argyle Line, a suburban railway located in West Central Scotland
 MV Argyle Caledonian MacBrayne ferry
 Argyle International Airport, St. Vincent & the Grenadines ((IATA: SVD, ICAO: TVSA)

Other uses 
 Argyle (pattern), a pattern consisting of diamonds in diagonal checkerboard arrangement
 Argyle diamond mine, Western Australia
 Argyle Hotel or The Argyle, a former name of Sunset Tower in West Hollywood, CA
 Argyle Middle School, Silver Spring, Maryland, USA
 Argyle Secondary School, British Columbia, Canada
 Hearst-Argyle Television, an American television station group majority-owned by the Hearst Corporation
 Plymouth Argyle F.C., an English football team
 "Argyle", a song by punk band The Bouncing Souls from the album Maniacal Laughter

See also 
 Argle (disambiguation)
 Argyle Street (disambiguation)
 Argyll (disambiguation)
 Argyll and Bute (disambiguation)
 Argile (disambiguation)
 Argo